This is a list of South Korean films that received a domestic theatrical release in 2014.

Box office
The highest-grossing South Korean films released in 2014, by domestic box office gross revenue, are as follows:

Released

References

External links
2014 in South Korea
2014 in South Korean music

List of 2014 box office number-one films in South Korea

2014
Film
South Korean